Juan José Mantecón (1895-1964) was a Spanish composer. He was a member of Generation of '27 and the Group of Eight, the latter of which also included composers Jesús Bal y Gay, Ernesto Halffter and his brother Rodolfo, Julián Bautista, Fernando Remacha, Rosa García Ascot, Salvador Bacarisse and Gustavo Pittaluga.

1895 births
1964 deaths
Spanish composers
Spanish male composers
20th-century composers
20th-century Spanish musicians
20th-century Spanish male musicians